The (Lord) Rector of the University of Glasgow is one of the most senior posts within the institution, elected every three years by students. The theoretical role of the rector is to represent students to the senior management of the university and raise issues which concern them. In order to achieve this, the rector is the statutory chair of the Court, the governing body of the university.

The position's place in the university was enshrined by statute in the Universities (Scotland) Act 1889, which provided for the election of a rector at all of the universities in existence at the time in Scotland (being St Andrews, Glasgow, Aberdeen and Edinburgh). Students of the University of Dundee also elect a rector.

The previous rector, Aamer Anwar, a lawyer based in Glasgow, chose not to seek reelection, and elections to choose his successor were postponed due to the COVID-19 pandemic. The elections were ultimately held in April 2021, with Lady Rae being elected to succeed Anwar as Rector.

Former rectors 
Students have not always voted for working rectors; anti-apartheid activists Winnie Mandela (1987–1990) and Albert Lutuli (1962–1965) were elected on the understanding that they would be unable to undertake the position's responsibilities, while Mordechai Vanunu (2005–2008) was unable to fulfil his duties as he was not allowed to leave Israel and Edward Snowden (2014–2017) was not expected to fulfill his duties due to an ongoing self-imposed exile in Russia. However, other recent Rectors have been elected on the presumption they will be working rectors, e.g. Ross Kemp (1999–2000), who resigned from the post after the Students' Representative Council voted to request his resignation, such was the extent of student dissatisfaction with his performance.
At the Rectorial election in February 2004, no nominations for the post of rector had been received. Upon the end of Greg Hemphill's term, the university was left without a rector for the first time in the position's history. The University Senate set another election date for December, when Mordechai Vanunu was elected. The post was left vacant for a second time at the end of Aamer Anwar's term in March 2020, with the scheduled Rectorial election postponed until March 2021 due to the COVID-19 pandemic.

Nations 
Until 1977, for Rectorial election purposes, the university was divided into four 'nations' based on the students' birthplace, originally called Clidisdaliae, Thevidaliae, Albaniae and Rosay, and later as Glottiana, Loudoniana, Transforthana and Rothseiana. Three of the 'nations' consisted of defined areas in Scotland, with Loudoniana consisting of students from all other places.

List of rectors

References

External links 
Student Representative Council description of post (includes link to detailed charter)
 Who, where and when: the History and Constitution of the University of Glasgow
University of Glasgow Story

 
Glasgow, Rector of
Glasgow